Fulcrifera is a genus of moths belonging to the subfamily Olethreutinae of the family Tortricidae.

Species
Fulcrifera affectana (Kennel, 1901)
Fulcrifera arabica (Amsel, 1958)
Fulcrifera cirrata Diakonoff, 1987
Fulcrifera fumida Kuznetzov, 1971
Fulcrifera horisma Razowski, 2013
Fulcrifera infirmana (Kennel, 1900)
Fulcrifera leucophaea Diakonoff, 1983
Fulcrifera luteiceps (Kuznetzov, 1962)
Fulcrifera mongolica Kuznetzov in Danilevsky & Kuznetzov, 1968
Fulcrifera nigroliciana (Chrtien, 1915)
Fulcrifera noctivaga Razowski, 1971
Fulcrifera orientis (Kuznetzov, 1966)
Fulcrifera periculosa (Meyrick, 1913)
Fulcrifera persinuata Komai & Horak, in Horak, 2006
Fulcrifera psamminitis (Meyrick, 1913)
Fulcrifera refrigescens (Meyrick, 1924)
Fulcrifera tricentra (Meyrick, 1907)

See also
List of Tortricidae genera

References

External links
tortricidae.com

Grapholitini
Tortricidae genera